Seattle Pro Musica is an American choir, based in Seattle, Washington, performing under the direction of conductor and artistic director Karen P. Thomas. Seattle Pro Musica is widely considered to be one of the finest ensembles in the Pacific Northwest, and has received international recognition and acclaim for its CD recordings and live performances. Seattle Pro Musica has appeared as a featured ensemble on the NPR radio show Saint Paul Sunday, has performed by invitation for the World Festival of Women's Singing 2004, Festival Vancouver 2003 in Canada, the American Guild of Organists National Convention 2000 and the American Choral Directors Association Northwest Division Conventions 2000 and 2006, as well as numerous Northwest festivals.
Seattle Pro Musica produced and hosted the American Masterpieces Choral Festival in 2007, under the auspices of the National Endowment for the Arts' American Masterpieces Choral Initiative.

Awards
 Margaret Hillis Achievement Award for Choral Excellence
 ASCAP/Chorus America Award for Adventurous Programming of Contemporary Music

Premieres
 Four Lewis Carroll Songs, Karen P. Thomas, 1989
 Three Medieval Lyrics, Karen P. Thomas, 1993
 Lux Lucis, Karen P. Thomas, 2003
 Veni, Sancte Spiritus, John Muehleisen, 2005
 Three New Motets, Steven Stucky, 2006
 Da Pacem, John Muehleisen, 2008
 Canticum Canticorum IV, Ivan Moody, 2010
 You Have Ravished My Heart, Karen P. Thomas, 2010
 I Sing of Love, Bernard Hughes, 2012
 Wild Nights, Karen P. Thomas, 2013
 Eternity Passing Over: an Arctic Requiem, John Muehleisen, 2015

Discography

CDs 
 Rachmaninov's All Night Vigil: Vespers (1998)
 Alnight by the Rose (2001)
 Weihnachten! A German Christmas (2002)
 Peace in Our Time (2002)
 Music of the Spirit (2006)
 American Masterpieces (2008)
 Navidad (2009)
 In Dulci Jubilo (2011)
 Horizons - digital release (2012)
 Celtic Christmas (2013)
 Northern Lights (2016)
 Silent Night (2019)
 Panta Rhei (2021)

External links
Seattle Pro Musica - Official Site

Choirs in Washington (state)
Musical groups from Seattle
Musical groups established in 1972
1972 establishments in Washington (state)